Live in London is a concert album by British heavy metal band Judas Priest, released on 8 April 2003. It was recorded at Brixton Academy on 19 December 2001, and is the last album the band released with Tim "Ripper" Owens before they reunited with Rob Halford. This contains the full concert in comparison to its DVD counterpart. The U.S. version was delayed until 8 April, three months following the European release with no known information.

Track listing

Personnel
Judas Priest
Tim "Ripper" Owens – vocals
Glenn Tipton – guitars
K. K. Downing – guitars
Ian Hill – bass guitar
Scott Travis – drums

Production
Engineered live by Will Shapland
Mixed by Sean Lynch
Engineered by Ricky Graham
Album cover by L-Space Design
Photography by George Chin

Charts

References

Judas Priest live albums
Albums produced by Tom Allom
2003 live albums
SPV/Steamhammer live albums
Albums recorded at the Brixton Academy